Park Road 100 (PR 100) is a park road in the Rio Grande Valley in Cameron County, in the U.S. state of Texas. It runs along South Padre Island through the town of the same name.

Route description
PR 100 begins at the Queen Isabella Causeway in Port Isabel, and continues west as State Highway 100. A 2.37-mile bridge crosses Laguna Madre, the only road connecting South Padre Island to the mainland. It then enters the town of South Padre Island and intersects itself near the Schlitterbahn water park and resort. The section of the road south of this intersection acts as a spur for the southernmost part of the island. It continues north through the island/city, passing many resorts, bars and restaurants. Just north of Edwin King Atwood Park, it runs for about half a mile between the Laguna Madre and the Gulf of Mexico before running only a few feet east of the former. It ends shortly after entering the Padre Island National Seashore.

Junction list

References

0100
Transportation in Cameron County, Texas
1968 establishments in Texas